Moriyoshi Dam is a gravity dam located in Akita Prefecture in Japan. The dam is used for flood control and power production. The catchment area of the dam is 139 km2. The dam impounds about 156  ha of land when full and can store 37200 thousand cubic meters of water. The construction of the dam was started on 1951 and completed in 1952.

References

Dams in Akita Prefecture
1952 establishments in Japan